Free Fall is a studio album by the rock band The Alvin Lee Band, released in 1980. "Take the Money" appears on the 1979 Gerry Rafferty release Night Owl as "Take the Money and Run".

Track listing
All tracks composed by Alvin Lee and Steve Gould; except where noted
 "I Don't Wanna Stop" – 4:11
 "Take the Money" (Gerry Rafferty) – 4:28
 "One Lonely Hour" – 4:28
 "Heartache" – 3:15
 "Stealin'" (Steve Gould) – 3:28
 "Ridin' Truckin'" (Alvin Lee) – 3:34
 "No More Lonely Nights" – 4:27
 "City Lights" (Alvin Lee) – 4:05
 "Sooner Or Later" (Rene Arnell) – 3:32
 "Dustbin City" (Keith Christmas) – 2:38

Personnel 
The Alvin Lee Band
Alvin Lee - guitar, vocals
Steve Gould - guitar, vocals
Mick Feat - bass guitar, vocals
Tom Compton - drums, percussion
with:
Derek Austin - synthesizer on "I Don't Wanna Stop" and "Sooner Or Later", piano on "Ridin' Truckin'"
Raphael Ravenscroft - saxophone on "Heartache" and "Ridin' Truckin'"
Pete Thoms - trombone on "Heartache" and "Ridin' Truckin'"
Al Kooper - organ on "Sooner Or Later"
Technical
Robert Patterson - executive producer
Andy Jaworski, John Stronach - engineer

References

Alvin Lee albums
1980 albums
Atlantic Records albums
Repertoire Records albums

bg:Free Fall